Lee Johnson is an arena football coach and former offensive lineman and defensive lineman. He played his college football at the University of Missouri, and was an AFL offensive lineman and defensive lineman from 1995 to 1996. He has been a football coach since 1997. After being the defensive coordinator for the Orlando Predators from 2010 to 2011, he became the San Antonio Talons head coach in 2011.

Lee then enrolled at University of Missouri, and played defensive line on the Missouri Tigers football team from 1987 to 1990.

The Washington Redskins signed Johnson after he went unselected in the 1991 NFL Draft. He played 2 years as an offensive lineman and defensive lineman in the AFL, with the Charlotte Rage from 1995 to 1996. He first became a regular starting offensive/defensive lineman in 1996 with Charlotte.

In 1997, while not even being one year removed from the AFL, Johnson was a defensive line coach for the Winnipeg Blue Bombers of the Canadian Football League. under head coach Jeff Reinebold. In 1998, Reinebold promoted Johnson to defensive coordinator. In 2000, he returned to the AFL as a defensive coordinator for the Carolina Cobras. He then became a defensive line coach at the NFL Europe level, starting in 2001 with the Berlin Thunder. After coaching Berlin to 2 consecutive World Bowl championships in 2001 & 2002, he moved to the Colorado Crush, and served as defensive coordinator during the 2003 season, before being demoted to offensive and defensive line coach and led the Crush to an ArenaBowl XIX championship. After the 2006 season, Johnson was named the defensive coordinator for the Austin Wranglers of the AFL. After the Wranglers folded, Johnson joined the Cleveland Gladiators as their offensive/defensive line coach. When the AFL shut down, Johnson took the role of line coach with the af2's Peoria Pirates, where he worked under Arena Football Hall of Fame head coach, Mike Hohensee. Johnson then took the defensive coordinator job with the Orlando Predators in 2010 and 2011, helping them extend their longest playoff berth streak in AFL history to 18 and 19 seasons. After the Predators two postseason runs, Johnson was offered the head coaching job for the San Antonio Talons. Johnson helped lead the Talons to a Central Division championship in 2012. Following the 2012 season, Johnson was signed to a 2-year contract extension.

In October 2014, Johnson was hired as the Director of Football Operations for the Portland Thunder. He was also the Assistant Defensive Coordinator and Special Teams Coordinator of the Thunder.

Head coaching record

Arena Football League

College

* Johnson was interim head coach

References

External links
 Lee Johnson (coach) at ArenaFan Online
 Lee Johnson (player) at ArenaFan Online

Year of birth missing (living people)
Living people
American football offensive linemen
American football defensive linemen
BC Lions players
Berlin Thunder coaches
Charlotte Rage players
Cleveland Gladiators coaches
Denver Broncos coaches
Lincoln Blue Tigers football coaches
Missouri Tigers football players
Orlando Predators coaches
San Antonio Talons coaches
Shreveport Pirates players
Tampa Bay Storm players
Winnipeg Blue Bombers coaches
African-American coaches of American football
African-American players of American football
Portland Thunder coaches
Colorado Crush coaches
Carolina Cobras coaches
Austin Wranglers coaches
Peoria Pirates coaches